The Samsung Galaxy E5 is an Android smartphone produced by Samsung Electronics. It was released in January 2015 & Discontinued in November 2016. This is a Mid-range device. The Galaxy E5 has an 8 Megapixel rear camera with LED flash and a 5 Megapixel front facing camera. It has a Quad-core 1.2 GHz CPU.

The Samsung Galaxy E5 has reached the European shores, but only sold in the German market [not counting CIS countries and Turkey (Middle East Region)].

Specifications

Hardware
The phone is powered with Qualcomm's Snapdragon 410 chipset which includes 1.2 GHz processor, Adreno 306 GPU and 1.5GB RAM, with 16GB of internal storage and an ample battery of 2400 mAh. The Samsung Galaxy E5 is fitted with a 5-inch HD Super AMOLED display and also includes an 8 MP rear camera and 5 MP front camera. Its dimensions are 141.6 x 70.2 x 7.3 mm (5.57 x 2.76 x 0.29 in).

Software
This phone was officially released with the Android 4.4.4 KitKat and was upgraded to Android 5.1.1 Lollipop on August 2, 2015. External memory support is up to 64GB.

Camera
There are two cameras on the phone, a primary and secondary: the primary one comprises 8 MP, 3264 x 2448 pixels, auto-focus, LED flash with Geo-tagging, touch focus, face detection, panorama. The video is  1080p@30fps. The secondary camera is a front-facing 5 MP.

Selfie
The Galaxy E5 is known for its great selfie experience.  It is said to "bring innovative features such as wide angled selfie, selfie with palm gesture, selfie with voice command and beauty face to enable users to capture high quality selfies with ease. The wide Selfie feature for the front camera allows users to capture selfies covering angles up to 120 degrees."

References

Samsung smartphones
Android (operating system) devices
Samsung Galaxy
Mobile phones introduced in 2014
Discontinued smartphones